Adrian Danek (born 1 August 1994) is a Polish professional footballer who plays as a full-back for Korona Kielce.

References

External links

1994 births
Living people
Polish footballers
Association football midfielders
Kolejarz Stróże players
Sandecja Nowy Sącz players
MKS Cracovia (football) players
Korona Kielce players
Ekstraklasa players
I liga players
Sportspeople from Nowy Sącz